Swatantra Theatre is an Indian theatre organization and troupe based in Pune, India. The troupe produces and performs plays in Hindi language. In addition to theatre productions, the troupe also carries theatre education, training and theatre festival. It has staged productions across India.

Swatantra Theatre was founded by Abhijeet Choudhary, Dhanashree Heblikar and Yuwaraj Shah in 2007. Choudhary serves as a director of the plays, while Heblikar serves as creative director.

History
In 2005, Abhijeet Choudhary, who was working as an actor at Asmita Theatre, and Dhanashree Heblikar, a stage actor, met in Pune and decided to start a theatre group that would produce Hindi-language plays solely, because at that time, the theatre of Pune was dominated by Marathi theatre. The theatre trope was founded on 15 August 2007. As of 2018, the troupe has 55 permanent members.

Activities
Choudhary directs the plays produced by the troupe, and Heblikar serves as creative director and manages aesthetics including music, light, set, costumes. Swatantra organizes Swatantra Rang Hindi Theater Festival, a two or three-days theatre festival, annually. It also organizes Children's Theatre Festival twice in a year, and an virtual theatre festival, Rang-e-Dastaan. It organized workshops twice in a month to give education about on voice modulation, body control and acting.

The theatre presents the Yuwaraj of Theatre (YOTA) of Award annually on its anniversary day.

Plays
Swatantra Theatre produces plays which often deal with the theme of social consciousness. It has also worked in experimental theatre. The troupe often performs plays on mental health awareness. The troupe has performed its plays at various places including Film and Television Institute of India,National School of Drama,
Deccan Literature Festival,Bal Gandharva Ranga Mandir and National Defence Academy (NDA).

Films 

The film has been receiving great response all over the world:

1) official Selection at Boden International Film Festival, Sweden

2) Official Selection at International World Film Awards

3) Official Selection at International Moving Film Festival, Iran

4) Winner at Calcutta International Cult Film Festival

5) Winner at Diamond Bell International Film Festival

6) Winner at Crown wood International Film Festival

7) Official Selection at Bettiah International film Festival

References

External links
 Official website

Theatrical organisations in India
Arts organizations established in 2006
Culture of Maharashtra
Theatres in Pune
Hindi theatre
2006 establishments in Maharashtra
Theatre companies in India